The Southeastern Center for Contemporary Art (SECCA) is a multimedia contemporary art gallery in Winston-Salem, North Carolina.

SECCA has no permanent collection but offers exhibitions of works by artists with regional, national, and international recognition. Although founded as a private institution, it became an operating entity of the North Carolina Museum of Art under the North Carolina Department of Natural and Cultural Resources in 2007. Admission is free.

SECCA has been accredited by the American Alliance of Museums (AAM) since 1979, one of only 300 museums in the United States to earn this distinction.

History
SECCA was founded in 1956 as the Winston-Salem Gallery of Fine Arts in Old Salem. James Gordon Hanes of the locally prominent Hanes family, who died in 1972, bequeathed his Norman Revival home built in 1929 and grounds to the gallery. The home was augmented with purpose-built exhibition space, and SECCA moved to the new location in 1977 under its current name. In 1990 the facility expanded again.

SECCA was the subject of national political and media notoriety in 1989 when 23 U.S. Senators signed a letter challenging its involvement, along with the National Endowment for the Arts, with a $15,000 arts prize awarded to controversial photographer Andres Serrano. Former U.S. Senators Jesse Helms (R-NC) and Alfonse D'Amato (R-NY) denounced SECCA in speeches on the floor of the Senate, taking particular issue with what has become Serrano's most famous work, "Piss Christ," a photograph of a crucifix submerged in the artists's urine.

Financial difficulties that began in 2003 forced SECCA to convey its property and operations to the state.

As of 2014, the curator of the non-profit gallery is Cora Fisher. Exhibitions since 2010 include works by Tomory Dodge, Jennifer West, Stanislav Libenský and Jaroslava Brychtová, Alison Elizabeth Taylor, Clark Whittington, Mark Jenkins, and Lee Walton.

Facilities

The complex reopened in 2010 after an extensive renovation by Szostak Design.

References

Further reading

External links
Official site

Arts centers in North Carolina
Museums in Winston-Salem, North Carolina
Art museums and galleries in North Carolina
Modern art museums in the United States
Contemporary art galleries in the United States
Art museums established in 1956
1956 establishments in North Carolina